Kamie is a feminine given name. Notable people with the name include:

Kamie Crawford (born 1992), American television host and beauty pageant winner
Kamie Ethridge (born 1964), American basketball player and coach

See also
Jamie

Feminine given names